Meu Pé de Laranja Lima (My Sweet Orange Tree) is a 1970 Brazilian drama film, based on the novel of the same name. Directed by Aurélio Teixeira, is the first film adaptation of the novel by José Mauro de Vasconcelos.

Plot 
A poor village boy has a single friend —  an orange tree, to whom he trusts his little secrets. But not all trees are destined to live long.

References

External links 
 

1970 films
1970 drama films
Brazilian drama films
1970s Portuguese-language films